Carnivel is a 1989 Malayalam comedy film written by S. N. Swamy and directed by P. G. Viswambharan. The film centres on the backdrops of a carnival. It stars Mammootty, Parvathy, Sukumaran and Babu Antony in pivotal roles. The film was shot in Thrissur and nearby areas including Puthukkad during March April.

Plot
Bharathan (Mammootty) and his friends (Mala Aravindan, Siddique and Bobby Kottarakkara) earn money by gambling in the streets. But Bharathan is forced to close down his business when a carnival is organised in the village. Bharathan manages to get a job in the carnival company and soon becomes the most trusted person of its owner Chandrappan, who is fondly called as Bhai. James, another worker at the company is envious about the growth of Bharathan. He attempts to kill Bharathan by removing the brakes of Bharathan's circus bike. Unfortunately, Bhai is killed in that accident. Bharathan, who once happened to witness James intimately engaging with Bhai's wife, is doubtful about James's involvement in the murder. Meanwhile, James, with the help of a police officer, casts Bharathan for the murder. In the climax, Bharathan proves his innocence and brings James in front of justice. On the parallel, a romance story between Bharathan and Gowri is shown. Gowri is a girl who had to sell herself to earn bread for her family.

Cast
 Mammootty as Bharathan
 Parvathy as Gowri 
 Sukumaran as Chandrappan aka Bhai 
 Babu Antony as James 
 Siddique as Salim, Bharathan's friend
 Mala Aravindan as Govindan, Bharathan's friend
 Bobby Kottarakkara as Peethambaran, Bharathan's friend 
 V. K. Sriraman as Syriac Kureekkadan 
 Usha as Vanaja 
 Valsala Menon as Kamalamma,
 Kozhikode Santha Devi as Gowri's mother
 R. V. Kunjikkuttan Thampuran as Panicker 
 Kundara Johny as Pocker
 Kunchan as Lobo
 M.S. Thripunithura as Kanaran, police constable

Box office
The film did average business.

External links
 

1980s Malayalam-language films
Films shot in Thrissur
Films directed by P. G. Viswambharan